Alpha is a 2019 Bangladeshi fantasy crime drama film starring Alamgir Kabir, Doyel Mash and ATM Shamsuzzaman in lead roles. It is the third direction of Nasiruddin Yousuff. The film was released on 26 April 2019. It was the submission of Bangladesh to the 92nd Academy Awards for the Academy Award for Best Foreign Language Film, but was not nominated.

Synopsis
The film tells the story of a rickshaw painter, Alpha. He saw disharmony of the society. He had to struggle to with the condition of concrete jungle.

Cast
 Alamgir Kabir as Alpha
 Al-Mamun Al Siyam as Sarfaraz
 Doyel Mash as Golenur
 ATM Shamsuzzaman as Gondho Jetha
 Heera Chowdhury as Hekmat
 Ishrat Nishat as Solaiman's mother
 Vaskor Rasha as Alpha's father

Release
The film was premiered on 20 April 2019 in Bangladesh Film Archive and it was released in theatres on 26 April 2019.

See also
 List of submissions to the 92nd Academy Awards for Best International Feature Film
 List of Bangladeshi submissions for the Academy Award for Best International Feature Film

References

External links
 

2019 films
2019 fantasy films
2019 crime drama films
Bangladeshi crime drama films
Bengali-language Bangladeshi films
2010s Bengali-language films